Lucien Corpechot (1871–1944) was a French journalist and author. He was the editor-in-chief of Le Gaulois, L'Écho de Paris and Le Figaro. Six of his works were awarded prizes by the Académie française.

References

1871 births
1944 deaths
French journalists